Martin Gorski (October 30, 1886 – December 4, 1949) was an American politician who served in the United States House of Representatives from 1943 to 1949, representing Illinois.

Early life and career
Born in Poland, Gorski immigrated in 1889 to the United States with his parents, who settled in Chicago, Illinois. Gorski graduated from business college and from Chicago (Illinois) Law School in 1917. He was admitted to the bar in 1917 and set up a practice in Chicago, Illinois. Gorski served as assistant State's attorney 1918-1920 and then he served as master in chancery of the Superior Court of Cook County from 1929 to 1942.

Tenure in Congress

Gorski was elected as a Democrat to the Seventy-eighth, Seventy-ninth, Eightieth and Eighty-first Congresses and served from January 3, 1943, until his death on December 4, 1949. He was interred in Resurrection Cemetery in Justice, Illinois.

See also
 List of United States Congress members who died in office (1900–49)

References

Martin Gorski at The Political Graveyard

1886 births
1949 deaths
Polish emigrants to the United States
Democratic Party members of the United States House of Representatives from Illinois
20th-century American politicians